Extreme cinema is a subgenre used for films distinguished by its use of excessive sex and violence, and such various extreme nature as mutilation and torture. It recently specializes in genre film, mostly both horror and drama.

Reception 
The rising popularity of Asian films in the 21st century has contributed to the growth of extreme cinema, although extreme cinema is still considered to be a horror film-based genre. Being a relatively recent genre, extreme cinema is controversial and widely unaccepted by the mainstream media. Extreme cinema films target a specific and small audience group.

History 

The prehistory of extreme cinema can be traced back to censorship of art films and advertising tactics for classical exploitation films to Anglophone markets alongside later liberal representations of sex in the first half of the 20th century onwards.

The name "extreme cinema" originated from a “line of Asian films that share a combination of sensational features, such as extreme violence, horror and shocking plots”. Extreme cinema can be rooted as "Asian Extreme", the term for Japanese and other Asian films used to its excessive nature. Early examples of Asian Extreme such as Ring (1998) and Battle Royale (2000).

Controversy 
Extreme cinema is highly criticized and debated by film critics and the general public. There have been debates over the hypersexualization that makes these films a threat to the ‘mainstream’ community standards.

There has also been criticism over the increasing use of violence in modern-day films. Ever since the emergence of slasher-gore films in the ’70s, the rising popularity of extreme cinema has contributed to the casual violence in popular media. Some criticize the easy exposure and unintended targeting of adolescence by extreme cinema films.

Classification and guidelines 
The British Board of Film Classification (BBFC) classifies extreme cinema films into an "R18" rating, which is defined as “special and legally restricted classification primarily for explicit works of consenting sex or strong fetish material involving adults.”

Notable films 

 A Serbian Film (2010)
 Act of Vengeance (1974)
 Antichrist (2009)
 Audition (1999)
 Auschwitz (2011)
 Bandit Queen  (1994)
 Begotten(1990)
 Benny's Video  (1992)
 Black Friday  (2004)
 Blood Feast (1963)
 Caligula, unrated version (1979)
 Caligula... The Untold Story (1982)
 Cannibal Holocaust (1980)
 The Cook, the Thief, His Wife & Her Lover (1989)
 Crash (1996)
 The Devils (1971)
 Dogtooth (2009)
 Faces of Death (1979)
 Funny Games (1997)
 Gandu  (2010)
 Hated: GG Allin and the Murder Junkies (1994)
 Hellraiser (1987)
 Henry: Portrait of a Serial Killer (1986)
 Hostel (2005) 
 The House That Jack Built (2018)
 The Human Centipede (2009)
 I Spit on Your Grave (1978)
 Ichi the Killer (2001)
 The Idiots (1998)
 Ilsa: She Wolf of the SS (1975)
 In the Realm of the Senses (1976)
 Irréversible (2002)
 Kama Sutra: A Tale of Love  (1996)
 Kinatay (2009)
 Maniac (1980)
 Man Bites Dog (1992)
 Mark of the Devil (1970)
 Martyrs (2008)
 Masking Threshold (2021)
 Matrubhoomi  (2003)
 Multiple Maniacs (1970)
 Mysterious Skin (2004)
 Natural Born Killers (1994)
 Nekromantik (1987)
 Oedipus Rex (1967)
 Oldboy (2003)
 Paanch  (2003)
 The Passion of the Christ  (2004)
 Pieces (1982)
 Pigsty (1969)
 Pink Flamingos (1972)
 The Poughkeepsie Tapes (2007)
 Poultrygeist: Night of the Chicken Dead (2006)
 Rambo 4 (2008)
 Re-Animator (1985)
 Relic (2020)
 Requiem for a Dream (2000)
 Saani Kaayidham (2022)
 The Sadness (2021)
 Salò, or the 120 Days of Sodom (1975)
 Saw  (2004)
 Sick: The Life and Death of Bob Flanagan, Supermasochist (1997)
 Stille Nacht (1969)
 Suicide Club  (2001)
 Sweet Movie (1974)
 Taxidermia (2006)
 Tetsuo: The Iron Man (1989)
 Thriller: A Cruel Picture (1973)
 Un Chien Andalou (1929)
 Vase de Noces (1974)
 Where the Dead Go to Die (2012)

Notable directors 
 Early Gaspar Noé (I Stand Alone, aforementioned Irréversible and Carne)
 Early Peter Jackson (Bad Taste and Dead Alive) 
 Early John Waters (aforementioned Multiple Maniacs and Pink Flamingos) 
 Early Wes Craven (1972's Last House on the Left and 1977's The Hills Have Eyes)
 Uwe Boll
 Bruno Dumont
 Lars von Trier
 Takashi Miike
 Pier Paolo Pasolini
 Eli Roth
 Sion Sono
 Herschell Gordon Lewis
 Jim Van Bebber
 Lloyd Kaufman

Legacy
Pink Flamingos was inducted into the National Film Registry in 2021.

Requiem for a Dream and Oldboy were named on the BBC's 100 Greatest Films of the 21st Century.

As the other examples in media, it can be seen in Japanese works, television, and video games as varied that are related to or inspired by extreme cinema due to its subject to its nature (e.g. Berserk, Game of Thrones, Redo of Healer, 2007's Manhunt 2, and 2018's Fear and Hunger).

See also
 Art horror
 Exploitation film
 Dogme 95
 Vulgar auteurism
 Giallo
 New French Extremity
 Social thriller

References

Sources 
 Lee, Eunah. “Trauma, excess, and the aesthetics of the affect: the extreme cinemas of Chan-Wook Park.” Post Script 2014:33. Literature Resource Center. Web. 7 Feb. 2016.
 Review of Film And Television Studies 13.1 (2015): 83-99. Scopus. Web. 7 Feb. 2016
 Totaro, Donato. “Sex and Violence: Journey into Extreme Cinema.” Offscreen7.11 (2003): n. pag. Web.
 King, Mike. The American Cinema of Excess: Extremes Of The National Mind On Film. n.p.: Jefferson, N.C : McFarland, c2009., 2009. JAMES MADISON UNIV's Catalog. Web. 10. Feb. 2016
 Malamuth, Neil. “Media's New Mood: Sexual Violence.” Media's New Mood: Sexual Violence. N.p., n.d. Web. 8 Feb. 2016.
 Fyfe, Kristen. “More Violence, More Sex, More Troubled Kids.” Media Research Center. MRC Culture, 11 Jan. 2007. Web. 9 Feb. 2016
 Pett, E. “A New Media Landscape? The BBFC,  Extreme Cinema As Cult, And Technological Change.” New Review of Film and Television Studies 13.1 (2015): 83-99. Scopus. Web. 9 Feb. 2016
 Dirks, Tim. “100 Most Controversial Films of All Time.” 100 Most Controversial Films of All Time. Filmsite, n.d. Web. 9 Feb. 2016.
 Sapolsky, Barry S., Fred Moliter, and Sarah Luque. “Sex and Violence in Slasher Films: Re-examining the Assumptions.” J&MC Quarterly 80.1 (2003): 28-38. SAGE Journals. Web. 9 Feb. 2016.
 Sargent, James D., Todd F. Hetherton, M. Bridget Ahrens, Madeline A. Dalton, Jennifer J. Tickle, and Michael L. Beach. “Adolescent Exposure to Extremely Violent Movies.” Journal of Adolescent Health 31.6 (2002): 449-454. JAMES MADISON UNIV's Catalog. Web.

External links
 Extreme Cinema:Top 25 Most Disturbing Films of All Time on Horror News
 Butcher Block articles about extreme cinema on Bloody Disgusting

Film and video terminology
Visual arts
Obscenity controversies in film
Censorship
1960s in film
1970s in film
1980s in film
1990s in film
2000s in film
2010s in film
2020s in film
Movements in cinema
Horror films
Postmodern art